Bowerbirds: The Art of Seduction is a BBC Television documentary film written and presented by David Attenborough. It's the 10th episode of the 14th series of the British wildlife documentary television series Natural World. It was first transmitted in 2000 and is part of the Attenborough in Paradise and Other Personal Voyages collection of 7 documentaries.

See also
List of Natural World episodes

References

From DVD

External links
 

2000 British television episodes
BBC television documentaries
Documentary films about nature
British television films